The United States Customs District of Newburyport was an administrative area for the collection of import duties on foreign goods that entered the United States by ship at the port of Newburyport. Established in 1789, it was abolished in 1910.

History
The District of Newburyport was established in the fifth statute passed by the First Congress in 1789 (ch.5). This act provided for the collection of the duties that had been laid down in the Hamilton Tariff earlier that year. The town of Newburyport was designated as a port of entry for customs purposes. The towns of Amesbury, Salisbury and Haverhill were designated as ports of delivery only. The district extended to all the waters and shores from the State of New Hampshire, to the north line of Ipswich. A collector, naval officer and surveyor were appointed to the district to reside at Newburyport, which was the location of the Customs House for the district.

Officers
The positions of collector, naval officer, and surveyor were appointed by the President, subject to confirmation by the Senate. From 1820 onwards, officers were limited to four-year commissions, at the end of which they needed to be reappointed by the President. They could be removed from office at the pleasure of the President.

Collector for the District (1789 - 1913)

Notes

United States Customs Service